The Eurovision Song Contest 1966 was the 11th edition of the annual Eurovision Song Contest. Organised by the European Broadcasting Union (EBU) and host broadcaster Compagnie Luxembourgeoise de Télédiffusion (CLT), the contest was held at the Villa Louvigny on 5 March 1966 and was hosted by Luxembourgish television presenter Josiane Chen.

Eighteen countries participated in the contest, the same that had competed the year before.

This was Udo Jürgens third consecutive entry in the contest, finally managing to score a victory for his native country Austria. Austria would not go on to win again until the  edition. This was also the first winning song to be performed in German. The contest is also noted for its historic results for several countries. Austria who came first,  who came second,  who came third and  who came fourth all achieved their best results up until then, some of which would stand for several decades.

The rule stating that a country could only sing in any of its national languages was originally created this year, possibly due to the 1965 edition's Swedish entry which was sung in English.

Location 

The 1966 Eurovision Song Contest was hosted in Luxembourg City. The venue chosen to host the 1966 contest was the Villa Louvigny, which was also the venue for the  edition. The building served as the headquarters of Compagnie Luxembourgeoise de Télédiffusion, the forerunner of RTL Group. It is located in Municipal Park, in the Ville Haute quarter of the centre of the city.

Format 
A new change in rules was introduced this year, allowing music experts to be present in the juries again. 
She was also the first singer to use a portable microphone.

This year's voting was also characterised with numerous cases of "neighbourly" or "bloc" voting - a problem that would plague the contest in many future decades.  for example received all its 16 points, bar one, from its Nordic neighbours - as did .  likewise received all its points from Nordic nations.

During the voting process, the presenter (Josiane Shen) accidentally greeted United Kingdom by saying "Good night London". She then realized her mistake and said "Good evening, London". Michael Aspel, who was the spokesperson for the United Kingdom at the time, replied "Good morning, Luxembourg", prompting laughter from Josiane and the audience. Additionally, the Spanish spokesperson gave their results in reverse order, presenting the 5 points first, then 3 points second and then the 1 point third.

Participating countries 

All countries who had participated in the 1965 contest returned for a second consecutive year.

Conductors 
Each performance had a conductor who was maestro of the orchestra.

 Willy Berking
 Arne Lamberth
 Jean Roderès
 Jean Roderès
 Mojmir Sepe
 Øivind Bergh
 Ossi Runne
 
 
 Gert-Ove Andersson
 
 Jean Roderès
 Alain Goraguer
 
 Franck Pourcel
 Dolf van der Linden
 Noel Kelehan
 Harry Rabinowitz

Returning artists

Participants and results

Detailed voting results

5 points 
Below is a summary of all 5 points in the final:

Spokespersons 

Listed below is the order in which votes were cast during the 1966 contest along with the spokesperson who was responsible for announcing the votes for their respective country.

 Werner Veigel
 Claus Toksvig
 André Hagon
 Camillo Felgen
 Dragana Marković
 Erik Diesen
 
 Maria Manuela Furtado
 
 
 Margarita Nicola
 
 TBC
 Enzo Tortora
 
 Herman Brouwer
 Frank Hall
 Michael Aspel

Broadcasts 

Each participating broadcaster was required to relay the contest via its networks. Non-participating EBU member broadcasters were also able to relay the contest as "passive participants". Broadcasters were able to send commentators to provide coverage of the contest in their own native language and to relay information about the artists and songs to their television viewers.

Known details on the broadcasts in each country, including the specific broadcasting stations and commentators are shown in the tables below. In addition to the participating countries, the contest was also reportedly broadcast in Morocco, and in Czechoslovakia, East Germany, Hungary, Poland, Romania and the Soviet Union via Intervision.

Incidents

Italian song arrangement
This was one of the first contests in which an entry was not accompanied by an orchestra. The Italian entry "Dio, come ti amo" performed by Domenico Modugno had been rearranged since its performance at the Sanremo Music Festival and officially broke the EBU rule that stated the arrangement should be finalised well in advance. During the Saturday afternoon rehearsal Modugno performed the new arrangement with three of his own musicians as opposed to the orchestra, which went over the three-minute time limit. Following his rehearsal Modugno was confronted by the show's producers about exceeding the time limit and was asked to use the original arrangement with the orchestra. Modugno was so dissatisfied with the orchestra that he threatened to withdraw from the contest. Both the producers and EBU scrutineer Clifford Brown felt it was too short notice to fly Gigliola Cinquetti to Luxembourg to represent Italy, so the EBU gave in and allowed Modugno to use his own ensemble instead of the orchestra. Despite websites and the official programme listing Angelo Giacomazzi as the conductor, Giacomazzi actually played the piano for the entry.

Notes

References

External links 

 
1966
Music festivals in Luxembourg
1966 in Luxembourg
1966 in music
1960s in Luxembourg City
Events in Luxembourg City
March 1966 events in Europe
Music in Luxembourg City